Atul Sen (? –  5 August, 1932) was a Bengali Indian independence movement revolutionary activist against British rule in India. He often used the aliases Sambhu and Kutti.

Early life 
Atul Sen was born in Senahati village, Khulna District in British India. His father's name was Ashwini Kumar Sen. While still a student, he joined the Revolutionary party. As a student, he came in contact with the famous revolutionaries of the village, Rasiklal Das, Anujacharan Sen, Ratikanta Dutt and Kiran Chandra Mukherjee and was initiated into the mantra of revolution.

Revolutionary activities 
He was an active member of the Jugantar Party, while studying in Jadavpur Engineering College. During the independence movement, the Statesman was campaigning against the revolutionaries in such a way that the revolutionaries decided to kill Watson, the editor of the newspaper, in order to retaliate and prevent it. 5 August 1932, he was given the responsibility to murder Sir Alfred Watson. But he failed to murder Mr. Watson alone and was arrested immediately. He committed suicide by consuming potassium cyanide to avoid being caught.

References 

1932 deaths
Revolutionary movement for Indian independence
Indian nationalism
Indian revolutionaries
Revolutionaries of Bengal during British Rule
Anti-British establishment revolutionaries from East Bengal
People from Khulna District
Indian independence activists from West Bengal